The Soyot are ethnic group of Turkic origin live mainly in the Oka region in the Okinsky District in the Buryatia, Russia. According to the 2010 census, there were 3,608 Soyots in Russia. Their extinct language (partly revitalized) was of a Turkic type and basically similar to the Dukhan and closely related to the Tofa language.

The Oka River, the largest river flowing down from the Western Sayans into the Angara is called the Ok-hem meaning "an arrow-river" by the Soyots of the Oka River basin.

They live dispersed among the Buryats and now speak the Buryat language.

Historical context
According to Larisa R. Pavlinskaya, a Russian ethnographer based in St. Petersburg, Russia, "The ancestors of the Soyots (and of the closely related Tofalars, Tozhu Tuvans, and Dukha) were proto-Samoyedic hunter-gatherers who arrived in the Eastern Sayan region from Western Siberia at the end of the third millennium BC and the beginning of the second millennium BC."

In 1726 Tunka Valley Buryats spoke of a people who self-identified as Soyot but who the Buryats called Kosogol Urianghai. At that time the Soyot herded reindeer on the upper Irkut River, a river in the Buryat Republic and Irkutsk Oblast of Russia to Lake Khövsgöl, Mongolia. Approximately 350–400 years ago, the Soyot people moved to Buryatia from the area of Khovsgol Lake. The traditional lifestyle of the Soyot people, like others in the Taiga group, was characterized by reindeer-breeding and hunting but by 2009 most people were living in villages.

In 1940 the Okinsky Region was designated as an aimag and officially recognized all residents of the Okinsky region as Buryat. Soyots lost their official identity as an ethnic group until 2000.

Reindeer herding
Bernhard Eduardovich Petri, (1884-1937) Professor of ethnology at Irkutsk University, member of the British Anthropological Society, the USSR State Academy of the History of Material Culture, and full member of the American Anthropological Association undertook research with the indigenous peoples of Siberia.  In 1926 Petri led the first anthropological expedition into the Soyot reindeer-herding region. Petri described a difficult period in Russian history claiming that Soyot reindeer herding was a "dying branch of the economy." "After the civil war, Petri was involved in "planning changes in the economic lives of minority peoples of the greater Altai-Sayan and Buryatia regions, including the nomadic reindeer-breeding Tungus (Evenki) and the Soyot and Tofalar." He was wrongfully accused of "espionage for the British and German intelligence services, and of anti-Soviet activity, specifically establishing contacts with nationalistic representatives of the Buryat people, so-called Pan-Mongols" and executed in Irkutsk in 1937. Pavlinskaya argued that "later research and data collected from Soyot elders show that the herding tradition easily overcame the period's difficulties and endured until the middle of the 20th century, when the government interfered."

Sev'yan I. Vainshtein  (1926–2008), a Russian ethnographer, archaeologist, historian and explorer of Siberian and Central Asian peoples and professor at the Institute of Ethnology and Anthropology of the Russian Academy of Sciences in Moscow, undertook expeditions to study reindeer-herders including the Soyot and published a number of works on the subject. Vainshtein argued that Sayan reindeer herding "is the oldest form of reindeer herding and is associated with the earliest domestication of the reindeer by the Samoyedic taiga population of the Sayan Mountains at the turn of the first millenium [sic] A.D...The Sayan region was apparently the origin of the economic and cultural complex of reindeer hunters-herdsmen that we now see among the various Evenki groups and the peoples of the Sayan area." The Sayan ethnic groups still live almost exclusively in the area of the Eastern Sayan mountains.

In 2000 reindeer peoples of Mongolia and Russia were working on collaborative efforts to rebuild reindeer-herding.

Plumley suggested that the Soyot of Buryatia's Okinsky Region, the Tofalar of Irkutsk Oblast, the Tozhu Tuvans of the Republic of Tuva in Russia, and the Dukha of Mongolia's Hovsgol Province, who are "cultures of reindeer-habitat" in Central Asia may well "have traded, inter-married and related across the breadth and width of the Sayans."

Collectivization in the  Union
During the period of collectivization in the Soviet Union, enforced under Stalin between 1928 and 1940, the Soyot and other Siberian inhabitants were forced into a settled way of life with socialistic enterprises replacing reindeer husbandry. The Soyots were moved to Sorok, Khurga, Bokson and Orlik, the administrative center of Okinsky District. Many were moved to cattle-breeding farms and they switched to Buryat-style husbandry.

Ossendowski's accounts of visiting the Soyots in the 1920s

The Oka River is a tributary of the Angara River. In the early 1920s, Dr. Ferdinand Ossendowski, a scientist and writer, traveled through the traditional lands of the Soyot during the Russian Revolution and published a book entitled Beasts, Men and Gods in which he described his experiences. In 1920 Ossendowski narrowly escaped being arrested by the Red Army who surrounded his house in the Siberian town of Krasnoyarsk, on the shores of the River Yenisei. He fled into the forest and lived for a while in the taiga along the shores of the Yenisei River. He and his companions followed the Tuba and Amyl Rivers to the Sayan mountains, where Urianhai, the northern part of Mongolia, begins. Urianhai is on the head waters of the Yenisei.

The Soyots helped Ossendowski and his companions escape. He appreciated their hospitality.

While in Urianhai, Ossendowski met Ta Lama, Prince of Soldjak and High Priest of the Buddhist Temple whose wife had red eyes. After he healed her eyes, the Prince "ordered one of the Soyots to guide their party to the Kosogol" Lake Khövsgöl. This was near the Tannu-Ola mountains.

Their Soyot guide took them through the Ulaan Taiga and the Darkhad Valley where they met Soyot herdmen rapidly driving their cattle over the Darkhat plain toward the northwest into Orgarkha Ola. They communicated to us very unpleasant news. They were fleeing the Bolsheviki from the Irkutsk district who had crossed the Mongolian border and captured the Russian colony at Khathyl on the southern shore of Lake Kosogol and were continuing their advance.

A Norwegian scientific expedition, led by Orjan Olsen, H. Printz, Anders K. Olsen, Fritz Jensen (Norway) and J. E. Gustschin (Russia) in the early 1910s provides information on the customs of these people before they were completely assimilated to the Buryats. The ethnographic data and photographs collected by these scientists were published by Olsen in the book: "Et primitivt folk de mongolske rennomader" (Cappeln, 1915). There is a Spanish edition: "Los soyotos, un pueblo primitivo. Nómadas mongoles pastores de renos" (Calpe, Madrid, 1921). With all its shortcomings (the book is flawed with the eurocentrism of its age), it is probably the best study of these isolated people before they adapted to the larger Buryat culture. It includes a short list of Soyot words, several dozen photographs and a fortunate preserved account of a Soyot shamanic tale of divination, along with a detailed account of both shamanic and lamaistic rituals among these people (both Buddhism and native animism syncretically coexisted at the time of the expedition).

Soyot as an endangered language

According to Valentin I. Rassadin, the Soyots spoke their own language of the Turkic family—which basically similar to the Dukhan and closely related to the Tofa language—fluently in the 1920s.(Rassadin 1996:10–22). Many Soyot married into the larger culture, the Buryats. By 1996 the language was almost lost (Rassadin 1996:10–22).

Their language has been reconstructed and a textbook has been published. The language is currently taught in some schools in Oka.

Shamanism
Among the various Soyot cultures, the central Soyot groups, keeping cattle and horses, show Khalkha-Mongolian  phenomena in their shamanism, the shamanism of Western Soyots, living on the steppe, is similar to that of Altai Turkic peoples. A shaman story narrates contacts between Soyots and Abakan Turkic peoples in a mythical form. The Karagas and Eastern (reindeer-breeding, mountain-inhabiting) Soyots have many similarities in their culture and shamanism. It was these two cultures who presented some ethnic features, phenomena lacking among neighboring Turkic peoples  In a Soyot shamanic song, sounds of bird and wolf are imitated to represent helping spirits of the shaman. According to Rassadin, Buryat Buddhist lamas attempted to put an end to Soyot shamanism (Rassadin 1996:10–-22).

In 2000 People's Khural (Grand Assembly) of the Republic of Buryatia changed the name of the Okinsky Region to the Soyot National Aimag at the request of government of the Okinsky Region. In 2000 the Soyot succeeded in restoring their name and identity as one of the officially recognized Indigenous small-numbered peoples of the North, Siberia and the Far East by decree of the Russian Government.

See also
 Reindeer in Russia

References

External links
 Rassadin, Valentin Ivanovich. Soyotica.
 Oleg Aliev's expedition to the Soyots
 Photos of the Soyots

Buryat people
Ethnic groups in Siberia
Indigenous peoples of North Asia
Indigenous small-numbered peoples of the North, Siberia and the Far East
Mongol peoples
Turkic peoples of Asia